(Chinese: Shèngtīan Gōng) is a Chinese style Taoist temple in Sakado, Saitama, Japan. It is the largest Taoist temple in Japan.

Features
It took 15 years to build this temple. The temple has been built with yellow roof tiles which are exclusively used only for building temples and for housing Emperors. The ceiling in the temple is made of glass of ten thousand pieces. One stone pillar in particular which is 5 m tall is carved from a single piece and the door is 4 m wide.

Three Taoist Deities (Three Pure Ones, Sānqīng Dàozǔ, the Taoist Triad) are worshipped in the temple. The main hall in the temple is built without any nails and has numerous impressive sculptures. Carvings on the stone pillars of five meters height are elaborate and called the Yin "Sōryū pillars". A drum tower to the left of the temple was added later, which offers views of the surroundings.

Worship
Prayers are offered daily at the temple with incense burning. The shape and colour of incense smoke are closely observed as it portends significant omens; formations of "Dragon" "Women", "Phoenix" are said to augur well for the devotee offering prayers. Devotees also offer prayers with talismans in different shrines of the temple complex, depending on their year of birth, of specific colour seeking fulfillment of their desires.

References

External links
  

Religious buildings and structures in Saitama Prefecture
Taiwanese diaspora in Asia
Taoist temples in Japan
20th-century Taoist temples
Sakado, Saitama